The Shire of Crows Nest was a local government area in the Darling Downs region of Queensland, Australia, immediately northeast of the regional city of Toowoomba. Its growth in later years has been fuelled by the expansion of Toowoomba, particularly the suburbs of Highfields and Blue Mountain Heights which, with a combined population of 7,333 in 2006, were home to over half the shire's population.

History

Crows Nest was named after an Aboriginal man called Jimmy Crow, who lived in a hollow tree near the present council swimming pool. Timber hauling bullock teams would stop in this area overnight and Jimmy Crow used to give them directions. There is a 6 ft statue of Jimmy Crow in Centenary Park, Crows Nest to honour this legend.

The first local government in the area was the Highfields Division, which was incorporated on 11 November 1879 under the Divisional Boards Act 1879. With the passage of the Local Authorities Act 1902, Highfields Division became the Shire of Highfields on 31 March 1903.

On 25 January 1913, the Shire of Crows Nest was excised from the Shire of Highfields, initially over a somewhat smaller area. When the Shires of Highfields and Drayton were abolished on 19 March 1949, part of each was included within the Shire of Crows Nest. The council had two divisions each of which returned four councillors, and a separately elected chairman (mayor from 1993).

On 15 March 2008, under the Local Government (Reform Implementation) Act 2007 passed by the Parliament of Queensland on 10 August 2007, the Shire of Crows Nest merged with the City of Toowoomba and the Shires of Cambooya, Clifton, Jondaryan, Millmerran, Pittsworth and Rosalie to form the Toowoomba Region.

Towns and localities

The Shire of Crows Nest includes the following settlements:

 Crows Nest
 Birnam1
 Blue Mountain Heights1
 Cabarlah
 Cawdor
 Djuan
 Geham
 Haden
 Hampton
 Highfields1
 Meringandan
 Pechey
 Ravensbourne
 Spring Bluff1

1 – split with the former City of Toowoomba

Chairmen
The following were the chairmen of the Crows Nest Shire Council. The use of the title mayor was only introduced in 1993.

Population

# The estimated 1947 population of the post-1949 area was 4,036.

Notable residents
 John French VC (1914–1942)
 Ben Walker Rugby League Player
 Chris Walker Rugby League Player
 Shane Walker Rugby League Player

Schools

  Amaroo Environmental Education Centre
  Crows Nest Special Education Unit
  Crows Nest State High School
  Crows Nest State Primary School
  Geham State Primary School
  Haden State Primary School
  Highfields State Primary School
  Mary MacKillop Catholic Primary School
  Meringandan State Primary School
  St Peters (Ironbark) Lutheran College
  Toowoomba Christian College

References

Further reading

External links
 University of Queensland: Queensland Places: Crows Nest Shire
 Crows Nest Photographic Memory  The Photographic Memories competition held in Crows Nest Shire, Queensland.  From the State Library of Queensland 'Queensland Stories' collection.

Former local government areas of Queensland
Darling Downs
Toowoomba
2008 disestablishments in Australia
Populated places disestablished in 2008